70 Virginis b (abbreviated 70 Vir b) is an extrasolar planet approximately 60 light-years away in the constellation of Virgo.  Announced in 1996 by Geoffrey Marcy and R. Paul Butler, 70 Virginis was one of the first stars confirmed to have planets orbiting it.  When first announced, 70 Virginis b was considered to be within its star's habitable zone (preferably in the "Goldilocks zone"), but it was later confirmed that the planet has an eccentric orbit, closer to its parent.

Characteristics

70 Virginis b is a gas giant extrasolar planet that is 7.4 times the mass of Jupiter and is in an eccentric 116-day orbit about its host. Its surface gravity is expected to be about six to eight times that of Jupiter's.  At the time of discovery in January 1996, it was believed that the star was only 29 ly away resulting in the star being less luminous based on its apparent magnitude.  As a result, the planet's orbit was thought to be in the habitable zone and the planet was nicknamed Goldilocks (not too cold or too hot).

The Hipparcos satellite later showed that the star was more distant from Earth and therefore brighter resulting in the planet being too hot to be in the habitable zone.

A significant update to the 70 Virginis system revised the orbit of the planet and used interferometry to show that, although the host star is similar in mass and temperature to the Sun, it is almost twice the radius of the Sun. The accuracy of these stellar parameters allowed the Habitable Zone to be calculated much more precisely, and orbital dynamics simulations show that a terrestrial planet can retain a stable orbit in the Habitable Zone despite the presence of the nearby eccentric giant planet.

See also

51 Pegasi b
Tau Boötis b
55 Cancri b
47 Ursae Majoris b
Upsilon Andromedae b

References

External links
 
 SolStation: 70 Virginis

Virgo (constellation)
Giant planets
Exoplanets discovered in 1996
Exoplanets detected by radial velocity